Laura Bailey (born 19 August 1992) is a retired Australian rules footballer who played for the Richmond Football Club in the AFL Women's competition (AFLW). She previously played eight matches over two seasons with the Western Bulldogs.

AFL Women's career

Western Bulldogs (2017-2018)
Bailey was drafted by the Western Bulldogs with their 19th selection and 143rd overall in the 2016 AFL Women's draft. She made her debut in the thirty-two point win against  at VU Whitten Oval in the opening round of the 2017 season. She played six matches in her debut season and kicked one goal. She was delisted by the Western Bulldogs at the end of the 2018 season.

Richmond (2020)
She made her Richmond debut against  at Ikon Park in the opening round of the 2020 season.
She announced her retirement on 27 March 2020.

Statistics
Statistics are correct to the end of the 2020 season.

|- style="background-color: #EAEAEA"
! scope="row" style="text-align:center" | 2017
|  || 13 || 6 || 1 || 0 || 14 || 29 || 43 || 6 || 10 || 0.2 || 0.0 || 2.3 || 4.8 || 7.2 || 1.0 || 1.7
|-
! scope="row" style="text-align:center" | 2018
|  || 13 || 2 || 0 || 1 || 4 || 1 || 5 || 1 || 4 || 0.0 || 0.5 || 2.0 || 0.5 || 2.5 || 0.5 || 2.0
|- style="background-color: #EAEAEA"
! scope="row" style="text-align:center" | 2019
| —  || —  || —  || — || — || — || — || — || — || — || — || — || — || — || — || — || —
|- style="background-color: #EAEAEA"
! scope="row" style="text-align:center" | 2020
| || 12 || 5 || 0 || 2 || 17 || 14 || 31 || 5 || 6 || 0.0 || 0.1 || 3.4 || 2.8 || 6.2 || 1.0 || 1.2
|- class="sortbottom"
! colspan=3| Career
! 13
! 1
! 3
! 35
! 44
! 79
! 12
! 20
! 0.1
! 0.1
! 2.3
! 3.8
! 6.0
! 0.9
! 1.8
|}

References

External links 

1992 births
Living people
Western Bulldogs (AFLW) players
Australian rules footballers from Victoria (Australia)
Victorian Women's Football League players
Richmond Football Club (AFLW) players